Anthony LoBianco (born October 19, 1936) is an Italian-American film, stage, and television actor. 

Born to first-generation Italian American parents in New York City, Lo Bianco began his career in theater, and appeared in several Broadway productions throughout the 1960s. He transitioned to film in the 1970s, starring in the New Hollywood crime films The Honeymoon Killers (1970), The French Connection (1971), and The Seven-Ups (1973). He won an Obie Award for his 1975 role in an Off-Broadway production of Yanks-3, Detroit-0, Top of the Seventh, and subsequently earned a Tony Award nomination for Best Actor for his role as Eddie in the 1983 Broadway revival of Arthur Miller's A View from the Bridge.

In addition to film and theater, Lo Bianco appeared as a guest-star on numerous television series throughout the 1970s and 1980s, including appearances on Police Story (1974–1976), Franco Zeffirelli's miniseries Jesus of Nazareth (1977), and Marco Polo (1982). In 1984, he appeared in a stage production of Hizzoner!, playing New York politician Fiorello LaGuardia, for which he won a New York Emmy Award. The one-man play was subsequently staged on Broadway in 1989, and Lo Bianco has gone on to perform several other Off-Broadway iterations of it, including LaGuardia (2008) and The Little Flower (2012–2015).

Early life
The son of Sicilian immigrants, Anthony LoBianco was born October 19, 1936 in Brooklyn, New York, the son of a housewife mother and a taxi driver father. He attended the William E. Grady CTE High School, a vocational school in Brooklyn. There, he had a teacher who encouraged him to try out for plays, which is when he began to develop an interest in acting. After graduating high school, he attended the Dramatic Workshop, studying acting and theater production.

Career
Lo Bianco was a Golden Gloves boxer and also founded the Triangle Theatre in 1963, serving as its artistic director for six years and collaborating with lighting designer Jules Fisher, playwright Jason Miller and actor Roy Scheider. He performed as an understudy in a 1964 Broadway production of Incident at Vichy, and the following year had a supporting role in a Broadway production of Tartuffe. From late 1965 through the spring of 1966, he starred on Broadway as Fray Marcos de Nizza in The Royal Hunt of the Sun.

He made his film debut in The Sex Perils of Paulette (1965) before appearing as a murderer in the semi-biographical crime film The Honeymoon Killers (1970). He subsequently appeared as Salvatore Boca in William Friedkin's critically acclaimed action film The French Connection (1971), and later starred as a police officer investigating a series of murders in Larry Cohen's horror film God Told Me To (1976). From 1974–1976, Lo Bianco played a lead role in six episodes of Joseph Wambaugh's anthology television series Police Story in the mid-1970s, four times alongside Don Meredith. He also appeared in several Italian films, including the Lee Van Cleef-starring crime comedy Mean Frank and Crazy Tony (1973).

In 1975, Lo Bianco won an Obie award for his off-Broadway performance as Duke Bronkowski in the baseball-themed play Yanks-3, Detroit-0, Top of the Seventh. In 1983, Lo Bianco was nominated for a Tony for his portrayal of Eddie Carbone in Arthur Miller's A View from the Bridge. He also won the 1983 Outer Critics Circle Award for this performance. In 1984, he had a supporting role in the action comedy City Heat, opposite Burt Reynolds and Clint Eastwood.

Lo Bianco first portrayed the larger-than-life mayor of New York City Fiorello H. La Guardia (mayor from 1933–45) in the one-man show Hizzoner!, written in 1984 by Paul Shyre. Lo Bianco won a local Daytime Emmy Award for the WNET Public Television version of the play, which was filmed at the Empire State Institute for the Performing Arts in Albany. The play was subsequently staged on Broadway in 1989, where it ran for 12 performances. Lo Bianco appeared in several independent films in the 1990s, and in 1995 appeared as Jimmy Jacobs in the HBO biographical film Tyson, followed by a minor role in Nixon, directed by Oliver Stone.

Lo Bianco continued his work on the life of LaGuardia in a revised revival of the play in 2008, titled LaGuardia. His third incantation of the mayor's life that had a limited run off Broadway in October 2012, titled The Little Flower. Lo Bianco has rewritten the play several times, which he purchased from Shyre's estate, and he views it as "a vehicle to express my concerns for the public and the political mess that we're in, which we continue to be in I think, and try to relate answers to failure." He performed it in Moscow shortly before the fall of the Soviet Union, and in 2015 was scheduled to perform it in Italy. The show was staged at LaGuardia Community College in May 2015.

A New York Times profile in 2015 reported that Lo Bianco was at work on a one-man show playing himself and a film script about his early life.

Personal life
Lo Bianco was previously the national spokesperson for the Order Sons of Italy in America. His humanitarian efforts have earned multiple awards, including Man of the Year for Outstanding Contributions to the Italian-American Community from the Police Society of New Jersey; a Man of the Year Award from the State of New Jersey Senate; a Lifetime Entertainment Award from the Columbus Day Parade Committee; the 1997 Golden Lion Award; Humanitarian Award of the Boys' Town of Italy.

Lo Bianco was married from 1964 until 1984 to Dora Landey. They had three daughters. He was married to Elizabeth Fitzpatrick from 2002 until 2008. He married his current wife, Alyse Best Muldoon, in June 2015.

Filmography

Film

Television

Partial stage credits

Awards and nominations

References

External links

 
 
 

1936 births
American male film actors
American male stage actors
American male television actors
Living people
Male actors from New York City
American people of Italian descent
People from Brooklyn